Guess Who's Sleeping in My Bed? is a 1973 American made-for-television comedy film starring Barbara Eden and Dean Jones, directed by Theodore J. Flicker from a teleplay written by Pamela Herbert Chais based on her play Six Weeks in August. It originally premiered as the ABC Movie of the Week on October 31, 1973.

Synopsis
Francine Gregory (Barbara Eden) is a divorced woman whose charming, vagabond, penniless ex-husband George (Dean Jones) brings hilarity and havoc into her life when he moves into her house with his new wife, baby, and dog during his annual summer visit.

Cast
Barbara Eden as Francine Gregory
Dean Jones as George Gregory
Ken Mars as Mitchell Bernard
Susanne Benton as Chloe Gregory
Todd Lookinland as Adam Gregory
Reta Shaw as Mrs. Guzmando
Diana Herbert as Delores

External links

1973 television films
1973 films
1973 comedy films
ABC Movie of the Week
ABC Motion Pictures films
American films based on plays
Films directed by Theodore J. Flicker
1970s English-language films